Jason Michael Snelling (born December 29, 1983) is a former American football running back. He played his entire career with the Atlanta Falcons of the National Football League. He was drafted by the Falcons in the seventh round of the 2007 NFL Draft. He played college football at Virginia.

Early years
Snelling played football at Lloyd C. Bird High School, where he was an all-district tailback and was named to the all-region team three times. He rushed for 3,300 yards during his career, including 1,444 yards and 14 touchdowns during his senior year. His jersey number was retired by the school in 2007

College career
Snelling enrolled to University of Virginia . His average of 5.3 yards per rush is the fifth on the school's all-time rushing record list, topped only by John Papit (1947–50), Terry Kirby (1989–92), Barry Word (1982–85) and Nikki Fisher (1988–91).
His 325 rushing yards in 2005 were the most by a Virginia fullback in a season since Charles Way totaled 517 yards in 1994, he also led the ACC fullbacks in rushing yards in 2005. Snelling was diagnosed with epilepsy, and the condition caused him to take a medical redshirt his sophomore season and later miss practices and games. His condition was eventually diagnosed and is now treated by medication. He was unable to talk openly about epilepsy until his senior season at Virginia.

Professional career

He was drafted by the Falcons in the seventh round of the 2007 NFL Draft (244 overall). He made his National Football League debut against the Tampa Bay Buccaneers and scored his first professional touchdown against the Arizona Cardinals.  He started his first game November 22, 2009 against the New York Giants, rushing for 76 yards and 2 touchdowns on 25 carries, while also catching 3 passes for 13 yards. On January 3, 2010, he rushed 25 times for a career-high 147 yards and added three receptions for 21 yards in a victory against the Tampa Bay Buccaneers, helping the Falcons to the first back-to-back winning seasons in the franchise's 44-year history. Snelling was re-signed by the Falcons on April 15, 2010. He finished the 2009 season with 613 yards on 142 carries with 4 rushing touchdowns. He also caught 30 passes for 259 yards and 1 touchdown.

On March 4, 2014, Snelling announced his retirement from the National Football League.

References

External links
 Atlanta Falcons bio

1983 births
Living people
Sportspeople from Toms River, New Jersey
People with epilepsy
American football fullbacks
Virginia Cavaliers football players
Atlanta Falcons players
Players of American football from New Jersey
Ed Block Courage Award recipients